41 Original Hits from the Soundtrack of American Graffiti is the official 1973 soundtrack album of the film American Graffiti. It has been certified triple platinum in the U.S., where it peaked at #10 on the Billboard 200 album chart.

Included in the film, but not on the soundtrack, are "Gee" by the Crows, "Louie Louie" by Flash Cadillac & the Continental Kids, and Harrison Ford's in-character a cappella rendition of "Some Enchanted Evening". (though the reason for the latter two's exclusion is due to the fact that those sequences weren't added to the film until the 1978 re-release, they were absent in the original 1973 released version)

A second compilation, titled More American Graffiti (MCA 8007) (and not to be confused with the 1979 film sequel of that name) was issued by MCA in early 1975 with George Lucas's approval. It features more rock and doo-wop hits from the late 1950s and early 1960s (only one of which, the Crows' "Gee", was featured in the film), along with additional Wolfman Jack dialogue. A third and final oldies compilation, titled American Graffiti Vol. III (MCA 8008) was also issued by MCA in early 1976. All three albums were released as 2-record sets, or as a double-length tape and are now entirely out of print.

All songs on the soundtrack album are presented in the order they appeared in the film.

The UK version of the soundtrack album is slightly reordered and omits three tracks; both Beach Boys songs and "Teen Angel" by Mark Dinning.  The album is thus retitled "38 Original Hits from the Sound Track of American Graffiti".

Wolfman Jack appears on seven tracks: "That'll Be The Day", "Fannie Mae", "Barbara Ann", "The Book of Love", "To the Aisle", "Green Onions", and "Only You (And You Alone)".

Differences between vinyl and CD releases

Fats Domino's "Ain't That a Shame": On the original vinyl release of the soundtrack, an alternate version including an overdubbed female chorus (created for Domino's 1963 LP Let's Dance with Domino) is used. The CD issue uses the original hit single recording.

"Love Potion No. 9" by the Clovers: The vinyl release features the LP version which concludes with the lyrics "I had so much fun that I'm going back again. I wonder what will happen with Love Potion No. 10." The CD features the single version of the song which concludes by repeating the verse "But when I kissed the cop at 34th and Vine, he broke my little bottle of Love Potion No. 9."

"Party Doll" by Buddy Knox: fades out earlier than the original version during the final chorus.

Track listing

LP

CD

Charts

Certifications

References

1973 soundtrack albums
MCA Records soundtracks
Rock soundtracks
Comedy film soundtracks